EA WorldView is a website specializing in news coverage and analysis of Iran, Syria and the wider Middle East.

History
The site was created in 2008 by Scott Lucas, now professor emeritus of International Politics and American Studies at the University of Birmingham, who maintains and edits the site. It was originally known as Enduring America, where its archives can still be read. During the 2009 Iranian presidential election protests, it liveblogged the demonstrations. EA later liveblogged the civil uprising phase of the Syrian civil war.

Organisation
Its partners include the University of Birmingham's Political Science and International Studies department (which hosts its podcast Political WorldView) and University College Dublin's Clinton Institute.

Reception
In 2013, journalist Richard Spencer of The Daily Telegraph described the site as "a blog of admittedly variable quality".

References

External links

Enduring America – previous incarnation as a blog

Internet properties established in 2008
British news websites
Politics of the Middle East